Kim Ki-taek (The romanization preferred by the author according to LTI Korea) is a modern Korean poet.

Life
Kim Ki-taek was born in 1957 in Anyang, Gyeonggi Province, South Korea. While many artists consider regular work, particularly the life of a white-collar worker, as a hindrance to creativity, Kim Ki-taek has successfully achieved a career as a poet while also working full-time. Kim was raised as an orphan, having been sent to an orphanage in Anyang from the Seoul Municipal Children's Hospital in 1961. Thus, Kim had to fend for himself from an early age and adapt to varied social situations. This history has given him a strong desire to have a stable position in society. Kim currently serves as a professor at Kyung Hee Cyber University.

Work
Kim's poetry is unsentimental and focuses on human physicality and the relationship between the body and the violence inflicted upon it. Fear and compulsion are integral parts of the human body, the poet believes. Material and psychological violence inflicted on the human body leaves its mark behind, and this mark eventually manifests itself in various habits that continue to inform one's sense of self. Kim carefully observes this process and records it in his poetry. For this reason, Kim has been described as “an observer of minute and microscopic details.”
 
A series of his poems linked by a common motif — “Mouse,” “Tiger,” “Snake,”and “Ox” — focus on the instinct to survive. The tension resulting from the violence and pain inherent in the game of survival is depicted without any sentimentality. However, the cold logic of survival that color Kim's poetic world is pierced by the presence of new life such as “a biddy crying in front of a subway station” and “the sound of an insect coming from a TV in the middle of a night.” In the history of violence and pain etched into our body over many generations, the poet discovers a glimpse of a wondrous new world featuring purity, innocence and mystery.

Awards
Kim Soo-young Literary Prize (1995)
Contemporary Literature (Hyundae Munhak) Award (2001)
Yi Soo Literary Prize (2004)
Midang Literary Award (2004)
Ji Hoon Literature Award (2006)
Sanghwa Poet's Award (2009)
Kyung Hee Literature Prize (2009)
Pyeongun Literature Prize (2013)

Works in translation
"El Chicle" - Spanish (Kkeom)

Works in Korean (partial list)
Fetal Sleep (Taea-ui jam 1991)
Storm in the Eye of a Needle (Baneulgumeong sok-ui pokpung 1994)
Office Worker (Samuwon 1999)
Ox (So 2005)
Gum (Kkeom 2009)
Crack, Crack (Gallajinda gallajinda 2012)

See also
Korean literature
List of Korean-language poets

References

1957 births
20th-century South Korean poets
Living people
21st-century South Korean poets
South Korean male poets
Midang Literary Award winners
20th-century male writers
21st-century male writers